Thalassoma robertsoni is a species of wrasse only known to occur in the waters around Clipperton Island. This species can reach  in standard length. The specific name of this species honours Dr. D. Ross Robertson of the Smithsonian Tropical Research Institute in recognition of his contribution to the study of reef fishes.

References

robertsoni
Taxa named by Gerald R. Allen
Fish described in 1995